Mark Anthony Wheeler (born April 1, 1970) is a former American football defensive tackle who played eight seasons in the National Football League for the Tampa Bay Buccaneers, New England Patriots, and the Philadelphia Eagles. He started in Super Bowl XXXI for the Patriots.  Wheeler played college football at Texas A&M University and was drafted in the third round of the 1992 NFL Draft.

1970 births
Living people
American football defensive tackles
Navarro Bulldogs football players
Texas A&M Aggies football players
Tampa Bay Buccaneers players
New England Patriots players
Philadelphia Eagles players